Neverita lewisii (previously known as Polinices lewisii, Lunatia lewisii, Euspira lewisii), common name Lewis's moon snail, is a species of large operculated sea snail. It is a predatory marine gastropod in the family Naticidae, the moon snails. Traditionally, this species was assigned to either the genus Lunatia, the genus Polinices or the genus Euspira. Recently, it was assigned to the genus Neverita based on molecular data.

This is the largest species in the family.

Distribution
Neverita lewisii lives in the Eastern Pacific, from British Columbia to northern Baja California, Mexico.

Habitat 

Description 
It has  an extremely large foot, which when the snail is active, is extended up over the shell and mantle cavity. Part of the propodium contains a black-tipped siphon which leads water into the mantle cavity. The cephalic tentacles, located on its head, are usually visible above the propodium.

When the animal retracts its soft parts into the shell, a lot of water is expelled, thus it is possible to close the shell with its tight-fitting operculum.

Diet 
Neverita lewisii feeds mainly on bivalve molluscs by drilling a hole in the shell with its radula and feeding on the organism's soft flesh.

Reproduction 
Like other moon snails, this species lays its eggs in a "sand collar".  The eggs may number in the thousands and hatch into microscopic larvae which feed on plankton until they undergo torsion and metamorphose into the adult stage.

References

Further reading
 Turgeon, D.; Quinn, J.F.; Bogan, A.E.; Coan, E.V.; Hochberg, F.G.; Lyons, W.G.; Mikkelsen, P.M.; Neves, R.J.; Roper, C.F.E.; Rosenberg, G.; Roth, B.; Scheltema, A.; Thompson, F.G.; Vecchione, M.; Williams, J.D. (1998). Common and scientific names of aquatic invertebrates from the United States and Canada: mollusks. 2nd ed. American Fisheries Society Special Publication, 26. American Fisheries Society: Bethesda, MD (USA). . IX, 526 + cd-rom pp.
 Hoehing, D. 2001. "Euspira lewisii" (On-line), Animal Diversity Web. Accessed December 1, 2008 at http://animaldiversity.ummz.umich.edu/site/accounts/information/Euspira_lewisii.html
 Brusca, Richard C., and Brusca, Gary J. Invertebrates. 2nd. Sunderland, MA: Sinauer Associates, Inc., 2003.
 Nybakken, James W. Diversity of the Invertebrates. Dubuque, IA: Times Mirror Higher Education Group, Inc., 1996.
 Lamb, A. and Hanby, B. P. (2005). Marine Life of the Pacific Northwest: A Photographic Encyclopedia of Invertebrates, Seaweeds, and Selected Fishes. Maderia Park, B. C. Harbour Publishing.
 Torigoe K. & Inaba A. (2011) Revision on the classification of Recent Naticidae. Bulletin of the Nishinomiya Shell Museum 7: 133 + 15 pp., 4 pls

External links 

Naticidae
Gastropods described in 1847